Alexander Yersin (5 April 1825, in Morges – 2 September 1863, in Lavaux) was a Swiss entomologist.

Alexander Yersin was a teacher. His entomological interests included Dermaptera, Mantodea and Orthoptera.
His collection is conserved in the Naturhistorisches Museum Wien (Vienna) and in the Natural History Museum of Geneva. His publications include Sur quelques Orthoptères nouveaux ou peu connus du midi de la France Bull. Soc. vaud. Hist. nat., 8 p., 1 plate (1854) and  Note sur quelques Orthoptères nouveaux ou peu connus d'Europes Ann. Soc. ent. Fr., pp. 509–537, pl. 10 (1860).

References
Forel, A.. 1864  [Yersin, A.]  Bull. Soc. vaud. Sci. nat., Lausanne 8  228-234
Hollier, J. A. 2007 An annotated list of the species described by Alexandre Yersin (1825?1863) and of the Yersin type material housed in the Muséum d'histoire naturelle in Geneva. Mitt. Schweiz. Ent. Ges., Zürich 80 : 71-77  B15 10201
Saussure, H. de 1866 [Yersin, A.]  Mitt. Schweiz. Ent. Ges., Zürich 2 [1866-68] 75-106, Portrait.

External links
Senckenberg World of Biodiversity Biografien der Entomologen der Welt

Swiss entomologists
1825 births
1863 deaths